Chabay is a surname. Notable people with the surname include:

Leslie Chabay (László Csabay, 1907–1989), Hungarian tenor opera singer
Nelson Chabay (1940–2018), Uruguayan footballer
Ruth Chabay (born 1949), American physics educator